The Balata Garden (3 hectares) is a private botanical garden located on the Route de Balata about 10 km outside of Fort-de-France, Martinique, French West Indies. It is open daily; an admission fee is charged.

History
The garden was begun in 1982 by horticulturist Jean-Philippe Thoze and opened to the public in 1986. It is set on former farmland with picturesque views of the Pitons du Carbet. Today the garden contains about 3,000 varieties of tropical plants from around the world, including 300 types of palm trees. It also contains good collections of anthuriums, begonias, bromeliads, cycads, heliconia, mahogany, Musa nana, and bamboo (Dendrocalamus).

See also 
 List of botanical gardens in France

References 

 Jardin de Balata
 Parcs et Jardins entry (French)
 AuJardin entry (French)
 Martinique Nature entry (French)
 Photographs

Balata, Jardin de
Fort-de-France
Balata, Jardin de